"Don't Tell Me You Love Me" is a song by Night Ranger written by Jack Blades from their 1982 album, Dawn Patrol. It was released as a single in December 1982.

The song was re-recorded for the music video game Rock Band and was released as downloadable content.

Background

Singer Jack Blades was thinking about a hypothetical relationship that is "fun and happy" until one person confesses they love the other, at which point tension begins. He wrote the chorus first, followed by a few verses. He didn't think he had written enough lyrics, but his producer convinced him he had conveyed the message of the song sufficiently in those few words.

Music video
The song's music video, which shows the band performing the song on rail tracks in front of an oncoming train, was directed by Daniel Halperin. and produced by Paul Flattery.
A live video for the song was released in 2016 to promote the live album 35 Years and a Night in Chicago.

Track listing
7" single

Radio edit single

Charts

References

1982 songs
1983 debut singles
Night Ranger songs
Songs written by Jack Blades
MCA Records singles